Ray-Bernice  Alexandra Kaiser Eames (née Kaiser; December 15, 1912 – August 21, 1988) was an American artist and designer who worked in a variety of media.

In creative partnership with her husband Charles Eames and The Eames Office, she was responsible for groundbreaking contributions in the fields of architecture, graphic design, textile design, film, and furniture. The Eames Office is most famous for its furniture, which is still being made today. Together, the Eameses are considered one of the most influential creative forces of the twentieth century.

During her lifetime, Ray Kaiser Eames was given notably less credit than she has been given posthumously in art and design literature, museum shows, and documentaries.

Biography

Early life 
Ray Eames was born in Sacramento, California to Alexander and Edna Burr Kaiser, and had an older brother named Maurice. Edna was Episcopalian and Alexander was raised Jewish but did not practice; Ray and Maurice were raised as Episcopalians. Eames was known to her family as Ray Ray. Eames' father managed a vaudeville theatre, the Empress Theater (now the Crest Theatre), in Sacramento until 1920, when he became an insurance salesman, later owning a downtown office to better support his family.

The family lived in an apartment for much of Ray's early childhood and moved to a bungalow outside of town. Her parents taught her to value objects which induce joy which later led to inventions in furniture design and toys. Her parents also instilled the value of enjoyment of nature.

Work and Education

Education 
Ray Eames graduated from Sacramento High School in February 1931. She was a member of the Art Club, the Big Sister Club, and was on the decorating committee for the senior dance.

In 1933, Kaiser graduated from the May Friend Bennett Women's College in Millbrook, New York (where her art teacher was Lu Duble), and moved to New York City to study abstract expressionist painting with Duble's mentor, Hans Hofmann.

New York Work 
In the 1930s, Kaiser’s artistic career centered around her painting. In 1936, Kaiser became a founding member of the American Abstract Artists (AAA) group and displayed paintings in their first show in 1937 at Riverside Museum in Manhattan. The AAA group promoted abstract art at a time when major galleries refused to show it. She was a key figure in the New York art scene at that time and was friends with Lee Krasner and Mercedes Matter, who were important figures in abstract expressionism. Kaiser has a painting in the permanent collection of The Whitney Museum of American Art. Little remains of her art from this period as it was lost.

Kaiser lived alone in New York City until she left the Hoffman Studio to return home to care for her ailing mother. Edna died in 1940.

Cranbrook Academy 
By September 1940, Kaiser was entertaining the idea of moving to and building a house in California. Her architect friend, Ben Baldwin, recommended that she would enjoy studying at the Cranbrook Academy of Art in Bloomfield Hills, Michigan. It was there that Kaiser learned a variety of arts, moving beyond solely painting.

Life and Work with Charles Eames 
It was also at Cranbrook where Kaiser met her husband-to-be, Charles Eames, who was the head of the department of industrial design there. Charles Eames was married at the time, with one child, but soon divorced his first wife. Charles and Ray were married in 1941, and Ray changed her name from Kaiser to Eames.

Settling in Los Angeles, California, Ray and Charles Eames began a highly successful and lauded career in design and architecture.

The Eames House 
Charles and Ray were asked to participate in the Case Study House Program, a housing program sponsored by Arts & Architecture magazine in the hopes of showcasing examples of economically-priced modern homes that utilized wartime and industrial materials. John Entenza, the owner and editor of Arts & Architecture magazine, recognized the importance of Charles and Ray’s thinking and design practices—alongside becoming a close friend of the couple. Charles and Eero Saarinen were hired to design Case Study House number 8, which would be the residence of Charles and Ray, in 1945. The home (alongside other Case Study houses) would share a five-acre parcel of land in the Pacific Palisades neighborhood north of Santa Monica, which overlooked the Pacific Ocean. Because of post-war material rationing, the materials ordered for the first draft of the Eames House (called “the Bridge House”) were backordered. Charles and Ray spent many days and nights on-site in the meadow picnicking, shooting arrows, and socializing with family, friends, and coworkers. They learned of their love for the eucalyptus grove, the expanse of land, and the unobstructed view of the ocean. They made the decision to not build the Bridge House and instead reconfigured the materials to create two separate structures nestled into the property’s hillside. Eero Saarinen had no part in this second draft of the Eames House; it was a full collaboration between Charles and Ray. The materials were finally delivered and the house was erected from February through December 1949. The Eameses moved in on Christmas Eve and it became their only residence for the remainder of their lives. It remains a milestone of modern architecture.

The Eames Office designed a few more pieces of architecture, many of which were never put into fruition. The Herman Miller Showroom on Beverly Boulevard in Los Angeles was built in 1950 and the De Pree House was constructed in Zeeland, Michigan for the founder of Herman Miller’s son, Max De Pree, and his growing family. Unbuilt projects include the Billy Wilder House, the prefabricated kit home known as the Kwikset House, and a national aquarium.

The Eames Office 

The designs of Ray and Charles were closely collaborative.

Graphic design 
The graphic and commercial artwork of the Eames Office projects can be largely attributed to Ray. Separately from Charles and the Eames Office, she designed twenty-seven covers for the journal Arts & Architecture from 1942 to 1948. She also contributed to the Eames furniture advertisements for Herman Miller from 1948.

Ray Eames had a sense for form and color and is primarily responsible for the Eames "look". Her sense made the difference between "good, very good, and 'Eames'." Ray Eames did not make drawings, but she documented and tracked all projects in the Eames Office. She documented and protected the enormous collection of photographs that the office accumulated over the years.

Textile design 
In 1947, Eames created several textile designs, two of which, "Crosspatch" and "Sea Things", were produced by Schiffer Prints, a company that also produced textiles by Salvador Dalí and Frank Lloyd Wright. Two of her textile patterns were distinguished with awards in a textile competition organized by MoMA. She worked on graphics for advertising, magazine covers, posters, timelines, game boards, invitations and business cards. Original examples of Ray Eames textiles can be found in many art museum collections. The Ray Eames textiles have been re-issued by Maharam as part of their “Textiles of the Twentieth Century” collection.

Plywood design 
Between 1943 and 1978, the Eames Office produced numerous furniture designs that were commercially manufactured, many of which utilized plywood. The first of the Eameses’ plywood pieces was a splint made for the US Navy. The idea arose when one of Eameses medical friends, told them of the problems caused by unhygienic metal splints. The metal splints were mass produced using simple designs molded in one plane rather the a more ergonomic compound curved design that better fit the human body. Ray Eames's early background in fashion design proved useful for this project, as the splint resembled a clothing pattern with a system of darts to contour the plywood to the shape of a soldier's leg. The Navy commissioned the Eameses to mass produce 150,000 splints. Their company became the Molded Plywood Products Division of Evans Plywood. The splint profits allowed Charles and Ray to expand their production and experiment with plywood furniture creations.

The Eames splint's use of bent plywood was a significant breakthrough for their trademark design. They would use the same bent plywood later in the seminal Lounge Chair Wood (LCW) and the Eames Lounge Chair.

Popular furniture 
Ray and Charles Eames worked together to create their most popular furniture:

Lounge Chair Wood (LCW) 
Charles Eames, Ray Eames, and Eero Saarinen applied their  knowledge of plywood gained from making their Navy splints to chair-making. The chair they designed won the Museum of Modern Art’s Organic Designs in Home Furnishings contest, and production by Herman Miller began in 1946.

Time magazine called it the century’s best design in its December 31, 1999 issue. Time wrote that “Eames took technology to meet a wartime need (for splints) and used it to make something elegant, light and comfortable. Much copied but never bettered.”

Lounge Chair 

In 1956, the Eameses introduced their Lounge Chair. The luxurious chair combined molded plywood with cushioning. They remain in production, as a status symbol. Charles Eames described the way its upholstery wears as “like a well-used first-baseman’s mitt.”

Shell Chair 
The Eames Fiberglass Shell Chair was first sold in 1950 after having been created in 1948 for the Museum of Modern Art’s “International Competition for Low-Cost Furniture Design.” With the entire seat made of plastic, it was a wholly novel creation, and the chairs were made in distinctive colors for the time 

The first shell chairs were released in three colors—Parchment, Greige, and Elephant Grey Hide. Less than a year later three more colors were added, Seafoam Green, Lemon Yellow, and Red Orange. These six colors comprised the "first generation" of Eames shell chairs, made from 1950 to 1954.

Films 
These films were created by Charles and Ray Eames for the Eames Office:

 Traveling Boy (1950)
 Parade or Here They Come Down Our Street (1952)
 A Communications Primer (1953)
 Bread (1953)
 House (1955)
 Day of the Dead (1957)
 Toccata for Toy Trains (1957)
 Glimpses of the U.S.A. (1959)
 An Introduction to Feedback (1960)
 Symmetry (1961)
 Topology (1961)
 IBM at the Fair (1964)
 Aquarium (1967)
 A Computer Glossary (1968)
 Tops (1969)
 Alpha (1972)
 Computer Perspective (1972)
 SX-70 (1972)
 Powers of Ten (1977)
 Atlas (1979)

The Eames Office's Legacy 
The Eames Office has historically been remembered primarily for its furniture. However, the design philosophy of Ray and Charles was more holistic, and was not limited to furniture. The Eameses were also filmmakers, information designers, and design theorists. The New York Times wrote in 2015 that “By the mid-1950s, the Eameses had become as indispensable to the American computer company IBM as they were to Herman Miller,” the Eames furniture manufacturer. Ray and Charles believed that design was “a way of life,” and they applied that belief to everything they did.

The Eameses had an deep appreciation for craftsmanship, fueled by their research trips to India, Japan, and Mexico.

The Eameses were known for their dedication to designing quality objects. Ray and Charles were “fellow workaholics.” In creating the Eames Lounge Chair, they tried 13 different versions of the armrest before finalizing it.

Later years 
The Eames Office's productivity slowed after the death of Charles Eames in August 1978. Ray Eames worked on several unfinished projects (e.g. a German version of the Mathematica exhibition), was a consultant to IBM, published books, gave lectures, accepted awards, and administered the Eames archive and estate. Approximately 1.5 million two-dimensional objects were organized and donated by Ray to the Library of Congress for archival safekeeping. She authored a book featuring all Eames Office projects from 1941 until the mid-80s, although much of it was altered before publication (just after Ray's death). In the years before her death Ray hosted visiting student groups, numbering in the region of fifty to sixty, and was planning to host one hundred members of the American Institute of Architects to view the house and picnic in the meadow.

Ray Eames died in Cedars Sinai Hospital, Los Angeles, California, on August 21, 1988, ten years to the day after Charles. They are buried next to each other in Calvary Cemetery in St. Louis. The office closed completely after Ray's death.

Legacy 
In celebration of what would have been Ray's 100th birthday, Vitra renamed a street at its Basel Campus "Ray-Eames-Strasse 1" in her honor.

On February 23, 2013 a 3,300-square-foot exhibition titled “Ray Eames: A Century of Modern Design,” opened in the Sacramento, California Museum. The exhibition ran for one year and featured work produced by Ray before she met Charles in 1941 in addition to the work of The Eames Office.

Eames along with her partner Charles Eames, prepared the India Report, based on which the Government of India set up the National Institute of Design in Ahmedabad, India.

Recognition 
Ray Eames' contributions to the work of the Eames Office were severely overlooked during her lifetime. This often included actively stating that Ray was a hardly significant part of the Eames Office. When the Eameses were on The Today Show in 1956, the chair in question was “designed by Charles Eames,” not by Ray and Charles. The host of the show, Arlene Francis, then stated that “when there is a very successful man there is an interesting and able woman behind him.” Then, Francis introduced Ray, saying “This is Mrs. Eames, and she’s going to tell us how she helps Charles.” The media almost always stated that the work was Charles’, sometimes footnoting Ray.

In the past few decades, however, Ray's work has been given more attention. In 1990, the journal Furniture History published a thorough interview between design historian Pat Kirkham and Ray Eames. In the introduction to the interview transcript, Kirkham wrote that "in the case of Charles and Ray Eames, the interchange of ideas between these two enormously talented individuals is particularly difficult to chart because their personal and design relationship was so close." Charles Eames was consistent in stating that Ray's role was imperative to the work the two did together.

Ray Eames has also received posthumous recognition for her personal fashion sense, which the New York Times described as "too maidenly to be echt-bohemian, too saucy to be quaint."

Awards 
100th Anniversary Gold Medal (craftsmanship and excellence in furniture design and execution): American Institute of Architects (AIA), with Charles Eames, 1957

Emmy Award (Graphics), "The Fabulous Fifties", with Charles Eames, 1960

Kaufmann International Design Award, with Charles Eames, 1961

Women of the Year 1977: California Museum of Science & Industry Muses, Los Angeles, 1977

25 Year Award: American Institute of Architects (AIA), with Charles Eames, 1978

Gold Medal: Royal Institute of British Architects (RIBA), with Charles Eames, London, 1979

Gold Medal: American Institute of Graphic Artists (AIGA), with Charles Eames, 1977

U.S. Postal Service Stamps, Charles and Ray Eames, 2008

Philosophy

See Also 

 National Institute of Design
 The India Report

References

External links 
Pioneering Women of American Architecture, Ray Kaiser Eames

1912 births
1988 deaths
Artists from Sacramento, California
American abstract artists
American furniture designers